The 1979 Island Holidays Classic, also known as the Hawaii Open, was a men's tennis tournament played an outdoor hard courts in Maui, Hawaii, in the United States that was part of the 1979 Colgate-Palmolive Grand Prix circuit. It was the sixth edition of the tournament and was held from October 1 through October 7, 1979. Seventh-seeded Bill Scanlon won his second consecutive singles title at the event.

Finals

Singles
 Bill Scanlon defeated  Peter Fleming 6–1, 6–1
 It was Scanlon's only singles title of the year and the 2nd of his career.

Doubles
 Nick Saviano /  John Lloyd defeated  Rod Frawley /  Francisco González 7–5, 6–4

References

External links
 ITF tournament edition details

Island Holidays Classic
Island Holidays Classic
Island Holidays Classic
Island Holidays Classic
Hawaii Open